Dietmar Peters (born 8 August 1949) is a German former ice hockey player who competed for SC Empor Rostock and SC Dynamo Berlin. He played for the East Germany national ice hockey team at the 1968 Winter Olympics in Grenoble.

References

1949 births
German ice hockey right wingers
Living people
Ice hockey players at the 1968 Winter Olympics
Olympic ice hockey players of East Germany
Sportspeople from Mecklenburg-Western Pomerania
SC Dynamo Berlin (ice hockey) players